Reinert K. Olsen (born 10 July 1978), known professionally as Ray Kay, is a Norwegian director and photographer who is currently based in Los Angeles. He is a music video and advertising director.

Ray Kay mostly directs music videos and has worked with artists such as Cher, Britney Spears, Lady Gaga, Justin Bieber, Jessie J, Nelly Furtado,  Beyoncé Knowles, Destiny's Child, Gloria Estefan, Steven Tyler, Enrique Iglesias, Adam Lambert, Cheryl Cole, Alesha Dixon, Diddy, Willow Smith, Amerie, Sean Paul, Christina Milian, The-Dream, Backstreet Boys, Melanie C, Ciara, Snoop Dogg, and Ghostface. He also photographs fashion stills and album covers, and has directed advertisements for brands such as Pepsi, AT&T, Mango and KFC.

His music videos have won several awards, including MTV Video Music Awards (USA), MuchMusic Video Awards and ZTV Awards.

He will make his feature directorial debut with "Paranormalcy", a fantasy film based on the New York Times bestselling book by Kiersten White. He is currently developing the project with Gil Adler.

Music videography

2015 
Taio Cruz – "Do What You Like"

2014 
Adelén – "Olé"
Justin Morelli – "Nobody Like Me"
Hunter Hayes – "Invisible"

2013 
Madcon featuring Kelly Rowland – "One Life"
Toni Braxton and Babyface – "Hurt You"
Austin Mahone featuring Flo Rida – "Say You're Just a Friend"
Cher – "Woman's World"
Emblem3 – "Chloe (You're the One I Want)"

2012 
Girls Aloud – "Something New"
Havana Brown featuring Pitbull – "We Run the Night"
Adam Lambert – "Better Than I Know Myself"
Aura Dione – "Friends"
Nelly Furtado – "Parking Lot"
Madcon – "In My Head"
Madcon featuring Stori – "Say Yeah"
Meital featuring Sean Kingston – "On Ya"
Erika Jayne featuring Flo Rida – "Get It Tonight"
Lara Scandar – "Falling Out of Love"
Lara Scandar – "Taalou Ghannou"

2011 
Jessie J – "Domino"
Aura Dione – "Geronimo"
Gloria Estefan – "Wepa"
Kristian Valen – "Letting Go"
Steven Tyler – "(It) Feels So Good"
Britney Spears – "Till The World Ends"
Slimmie Hendrix – "Stuntman"
Lara Scandar – "Chains"
Bera – "My Favourite Things"
Vika – "No Breaking Me Down"

2010 
Willow Smith – "Whip My Hair"
Flo Rida featuring Akon – "Who Dat Girl"
James Blunt – "Stay the Night"
Jeremih featuring Ludacris – "I Like"
Alesha Dixon – "Drummer Boy"
Range featuring Rick Ross – "Ghetto Dance"
Orianthi – "Shut Up & Kiss Me"
Sean Kingston featuring Justin Bieber – "Eenie Meenie"
Benny Benassi featuring Kelis, apl.de.ap and Jean Baptiste – "Spaceship"
Victoria Krutoy – "Falling" (co-directed by Sequoia B)
Justin Bieber featuring Ludacris – "Baby"
Alex Gardner – "I'm Not Mad"
Shontelle – "Licky (Under the Covers)"

2009 
Cheryl Cole – "Fight For This Love"
Adam Lambert – "For Your Entertainment"
Mini Viva – "I Wish"
Lara Scandar – "Mission is You"
Mini Viva – "Left My Heart in Tokyo"
Sean Paul – "So Fine"
Amerie – "Why R U"
Kristinia DeBarge – "Goodbye"
Paradiso Girls featuring Eve and Lil Jon – "Patron Tequila"
RichGirl – "He Ain't Wit Me Now (Tho)"
Chrisette Michele featuring Ne-Yo – "What You Do"
Jada – "American Cowboy"
Flipsyde – "When It Was Good"
Chrisette Michele – "Epiphany"
Ryan Star – "Last Train Home"
The-Dream – "Rockin' That Thang"
Enrique Iglesias featuring Ciara – "Takin' Back My Love"
Christina Milian – "Us Against The World"

2008 
Trey Songz – "Last Time"
Sean Kingston featuring Juelz Santana and Élan – "There's Nothin'"
Kat DeLuna featuring Busta Rhymes and Don Omar – "Run The Show"
Sirens featuring Najee – "Club LA LA"
Jordin Sparks – "One Step at a Time"
Donnie Klang featuring Diddy – "Take You There"
Lady Gaga – "Poker Face"
Jadakiss featuring Ne-Yo- "By My Side"
LMFAO – "I'm in Miami Bitch"
Mira Craig – "I'm The One"

2007 
LAX Gurlz – "Forget You"
Beyoncé – "Freakum Dress"
Sterling Simms – "Nasty Girl"
Pittsburgh Slim – "Girls Kiss Girls"
Jagged Edge featuring Ashanti and Jermaine Dupri – "Put a Little Umph in It"
The-Dream featuring Fabolous – "Shawty Is a 10"
Backstreet Boys – "Inconsolable"
Lucy Walsh – "So Uncool" (version 2)
I Nine – "7 Days of Lonely"
Johnta Austin – "The One That Got Away"

2006 
Ghostface Killah featuring Ne-Yo – "Back Like That"
Christina Milian featuring Young Jeezy – "Say I"
Black Buddafly featuring Fabolous – "Bad Girl"
Nick Lachey – "What's Left of Me"
Cassie – "Me & U"
Nick Lachey – "I Can't Hate You Anymore"
Monica featuring Dem Franchise Boyz – "Everytime Tha Beat Drop"
One Chance featuring D4L – "Look at Her"
Johnta Austin featuring Jermaine Dupri – "Turn It Up"
Paula DeAnda – "Walk Away (Remember Me)"
Stacie Orrico – "So Simple"
Jamelia – "Beware of the Dog"
Fantasia featuring Big Boi – "Hood Boy"

2005 
Mark Morrison featuring Tanya Stephens – "Dance For Me"
Melanie C – "Next Best Superstar"
Natalie – "Goin' Crazy
Pretty Ricky – "Grind With Me"
Mario – "Here I Go Again"
Frankie J – "How To Deal"
Teairra Mari – "Make Her Feel Good"
Mashonda ft Snoop Dogg – "Blackout"
Pretty Ricky – "Your Body"

2004 
2Play – "It Can't Be Right"
Monroe – "Smile"
Kleen Cut – "Hands Up"
Shifty – "Slide Along Side"
Sirens – "Baby (Off The Wall)"
Christina Milian featuring Joe Budden – "Whatever U Want"
Nivea featuring Lil Jon and Youngbloodz – "Okay"
Raghav – "Attraction / Angel Eyes"
Destiny's Child featuring T.I. and Lil Wayne – "Soldier"
Duchess – "Come Check My Style"
Rouge – "Don't Be Shy"
Trick Daddy featuring Lil' Kim and Cee-Lo – "Sugar (Gimme Some)"

2003 
Anne Lingan – "Kicking You Out"
Venke Knutson – "Panic"
Kurt Nilsen – "She's So High"
Melanie C – "Yeh Yeh Yeh"
Speedway – "Save Yourself"
Lene V – Ad spots
Black Diamond Brigade – "Black Diamond"
Winta featuring Anton Gordon  – "Hot Romance (Rok With U)"
Coree – "I Don't Give a Damn"
Winta – "I Want You"

2002 
Equicez – "Live from Passit"
Lene V – Ad spot
Paperboys – "Barcelona"
Sport 1 – Ad spots
D'lay – "Run Away"
Ann-Louise – "Can You Tell Me"
Winta – "Emotions"
Gil Bonden – "Shine"
D'sound – "Do I Need a Reason"

2000 
Voodoobeats – "The One"

External links 
Raykay.com
Rockhard Films
TV2 Norway program about Ray Kay (Jan 2009)
NRK Norway "Lørdagsrevyen" segment about Ray Kay (April 2009)
Ray Kay guest at NRK Nasjonalgalleriet (September 2010)

References

Further reading 
VG.no: Ray Kay's videos viewed more than 1 Billion times
VG.no: Ray Kay and Britney on the TTWE video
MTV.com: Britney shoots TTWE video with Ray Kay
MTV.com: Adam Lambert about the Ray Kay video
VG.no: Ray Kay directs Adam Lambert
730.no: Adam Lambert & Ray Kay
730.no: Ray Kay was right – Cheryl Cole is #1 in UK
730.no: Ray Kay & Cheryl Cole
MTV.com: Interview with Ray Kay for MTV Awards
Db.no: Ray Kay nominated for four MTV Awards
VG.no: Four MTV award nominations for Ray Kay
Db.no: Ray Kay and Lady Gaga at MTV Awards after party
VG.no: Ray Kay at Amanda show
VG TV: Ray Kay wants to direct feature
730.no: Ray Kay & Mini Viva
VG.no: Ray Kay & Lady GaGa win Best Video Award
730.no: Lady GaGa & Ray Kay
Side2.no: Lady GaGa & Ray Kay
H-avis: Enrique, Ciara & Ray Kay
730.no: Enrique, Ciara & Ray Kay
VG.no: Enrique, Ciara & Ray Kay
Side2.no: Enrique, Ciara & Ray Kay
730.no: Enrique, Ciara & Ray Kay
RapUp.Com: On set of The Dream's "Rockin'" video
VG.no Backstreet Boys & Ray Kay
Dagbladet.no: Beyonce & Ray Kay
VG.no: Beyonce & Ray Kay
Dagbladet.no: Nick Lachey & Ray Kay
RapUp.com: On set with Christina Milian & Ray Kay
730.no: Christina Milian & Ray Kay
 Toya's World: Christina Milian & Ray Kay
Giant Magazine: Christina Milian & Ray Kay
Side2.no: Christina Milian & Ray Kay
730.no: Ray Kay & Christina Milian
Side2.no: Ray Kay stories & pictures
VG.no: Ray Kay set pictures
730.no: Ray Kay on TV2
730.no: #1 on YouTube
730.no: Ray Kay & Jadakiss
VG.no: Diddy & Ray Kay
VG-TV: Mira Craig and Ray Kay
Curiousartist.com: Ray Kay interview

Norwegian music video directors
Living people
People from Haugesund
Norwegian photographers
Advertising directors
1978 births